The Jeunesse Gabonais was the first political party in colonial Gabon. Founded in 1922, it was "outspokenly anti-colonialist without being anti-French". The party's goals were primarily focused on improving educational opportunities and assimilated Gabonese involvement in colonial administration.

References

History of Gabon
Defunct political parties in Gabon
Political parties established in 1922
1922 establishments in Gabon